Július Kánássy (born 11 March 1934 in Košice, Czechoslovakia), original Hungarian name: Kánássy Gyula, nicknamed Šušu, Egérke or Garrincha from Košice, is a former Slovak football winger and later coach. He played for Lokomotíva Košice (1953), Spartak VSS Košice (1954–1956), Slovan Bratislava (1957–1959) and ended his career in Jednota/VSS Košice (1959–1968). Kánássy made over 300 appearances at Czechoslovak Football.

Kánássy was capped twice for the Czechoslovakia national football B team and 7 times for Czechoslovak youth squads but he never got a chance at the First team.

He acted as assistant coach at VSS Košice alongside Jozef Vengloš in the 1970–71 season when club finished second at the Czechoslovak First League.

References

1934 births
Living people
Slovak footballers
Czechoslovak footballers
Association football wingers
FC VSS Košice players
ŠK Slovan Bratislava players
Sportspeople from Košice